Frosty Peak Volcano, also known as Mt. Frosty, Frosty Volcano, or Cold Bay Volcano, is a 6,299 ft (1,920 m)  stratovolcano at the southwest end of the Alaska Peninsula in the U.S. state of Alaska.

History 
Frosty Peak is the tallest and most recently formed peak of the volcanic complex. Its exact age is unknown, but it was probably formed in the middle to late Pleistocene, and possibly erupted even more recently. Frosty Peak is the southern cone of the double-coned Frosty Volcano, which formed in the middle Pleistocene some time before the Wisconsin Glaciation.

Frosty Volcano itself is located on the northern flank of an even older volcano, the Morzhovoi Volcano. Morzhovoi Volcano was probably formed in the early to middle Pleistocene, and collapsed into a caldera. The highest points that remain from the caldera are called North and South Walrus Peak.

See also
List of volcanoes in the United States of America
List of Stratovolcanoes

References

External links
 
 Volcanoes of the Alaska Peninsula and Aleutian Islands-Selected Photographs
 Alaska Volcano Observatory

Volcanoes of Aleutians East Borough, Alaska
Stratovolcanoes of the United States
Mountains of Alaska
Volcanoes of Alaska
Aleutian Range
Mountains of Aleutians East Borough, Alaska
Pleistocene stratovolcanoes